The 1982 Swiss Open was a men's tennis tournament played on outdoor clay courts in Gstaad, Switzerland that was part of the  1982 Volvo Grand Prix tennis circuit. It was the 36th edition of the tournament and was held from 5 July through 11 July 1982. Second-seeded José Luis Clerc won the singles title.

Finals

Singles
 José Luis Clerc defeated  Guillermo Vilas 6–1, 6–3, 6–2
 It was Clerc's 3rd singles title of the year and the 19th of his career.

Doubles
 Ferdi Taygan/  Sandy Mayer defeated  Heinz Günthardt /  Markus Günthardt 6–2, 6–3

References

External links
  Official website
 ATP tournament profile
 ITF tournament edition details

Swiss Open (tennis)
Swiss Open Gstaad
1982 Grand Prix (tennis)